Lampropeltis calligaster is a species of kingsnake known commonly as the prairie kingsnake or yellow-bellied kingsnake.

Geographic range
Prairie kingsnakes are found mostly in the midwestern and southeastern United States although they can be found in other areas. Their additional range extends west from southeast Nebraska to eastern Texas.

Description 
It is light brown or grey in color, with dark grey, dark brown, or reddish-brown blotching down the length of their bodies. They are easily mistaken for various species of rat snake of the genus Pantherophis, which share habitat, and can have similar markings. Some specimens have their markings faded, to appear almost a solid brown color. Juveniles usually have a brown stripe down the back of their bodies. They have two black spots behind the head and smaller black spots down the back on both sides of the stripe.

Behavior 
Prairie kingsnakes' preferred habitat is open grassland with loose, dry soil, typically on the edge of a forested region, not far from a permanent source of water. Their diet consists primarily of rodents, but they will also consume lizards, frogs and occasionally other snakes. They are nonvenomous, and typically docile. Like most colubrids, if harassed they will shake their tail, which if in dry leaf litter can sound remarkably like a rattlesnake. They are not typically prone to biting, and if handled will often excrete a foul-smelling musk.  When threatened, they flatten and appear to have white spots.

Habitat 
They are often found in abandoned structures, underneath logs, debris, and inside of tree trunks. They are typically unseen by people not searching for them due to their secretive nature. The mole kingsnake is fossorial as their name would suggest. However, when they are found aboveground they are found in open areas such as fields, cultivated lands, thickets, and edge habitats.

Reproduction 
Elements of the mole kingsnake's reproduction corresponds, in part, to the general colubrid mating pattern. Egg laying has been reported in June through July, with clutch sizes ranging from 6 - 17 eggs.

References 

Florida Museum of Natural History: Lampropeltis calligaster rhombomaculata
Prairie Kingsnake, Reptiles and Amphibians of Iowa

calligaster
Endemic fauna of the United States
Reptiles of the United States
Fauna of the Plains-Midwest (United States)
Fauna of the Southeastern United States
Reptiles described in 1827
Taxa named by Richard Harlan